The Lumis is a river of north-western New Ireland, Papua New Guinea. The name was proposed by Stewart and Sandy in 1986.

References

Rivers of New Ireland Province